Pietro Chesi (24 November 1902 – 15 August 1944) was an Italian cyclist.

He was a professional from 1925 to 1934 and won Milan–San Remo in 1927 with an attack on the Passo del Turchino. He left the favorite to win, Alfredo Binda, 9 minutes behind.

He died when he was shot by anti-fascist partisans.

Major results
1926
 6th Giro dell'Umbria
1927
 1st Milan–San Remo
1928
 6th Milan–San Remo
 10th Overall Giro d'Italia
 10th Overall Giro della Provincia di Reggio Calabria

References

1902 births
1944 deaths
Italian male cyclists
Italian civilians killed in World War II
Deaths by firearm in Italy
Sportspeople from the Metropolitan City of Florence
Cyclists from Tuscany